Fe or FE may refer to:

Arts and entertainment 
 Carolyn Fe, Filipina singer and actress 
Fe (Reyli album)
 Fe (singer), a British singer-songwriter
 "Fe" (song), a song by Jorge González
 Fe (Souled American album)
 Fe (video game), a video game developed by Zoink Games and published by Electronic Arts
 Fallen Earth, a computer game
 Fire Emblem, a series of video games developed by Intelligent Systems and published by Nintendo

Education 
 FE exam or Fundamentals of Engineering exam
 Further education, post-16, non-university education in the UK

Organizations 
 Falange Española (Spanish Phalanx), a former Spanish political organization
 Fe (baseball), a Cuban League baseball team
 , the Danish Defence Intelligence Service
 Fuji Electric, a Japanese company
 Primaris Airlines (IATA code FE)

Science and technology

Mathematics 
 Fixed effects model, a statistical model parameter which is fixed or non-random

Physics and chemistry 
 Iron, symbol Fe, a chemical element
 Field emission, an emission of electrons induced by external electromagnetic fields
 Faraday efficiency, the efficiency of a catalyst in electrochemistry

Technology 
 Ford FE engine, a Ford V8 motor hydrocarbon engine
 FE, part of Mazda's F engine family
 Nikon FE, a 35 mm SLR camera
 Flight engineer, aircraft crew member that monitor and operate the aircraft systems
 Front end, the user interaction interface, usually in web-based applications
 Fast Ethernet

Other uses
 the Hebrew letter fe 
 Fe (rune), the f-rune  of the Younger Futhark
 FE-Schrift, a typeface used on vehicle registration plates in Germany
 Province of Ferrara (ISO 3166-2:IT code)
 Flat Earth, a pseudoscientific theory
 Formula E, a class of auto racing using electrically powered cars
 Dominical letter FE, for a leap year starting on Tuesday
 Extraverted feeling, in the Myers–Briggs Type Indicator